David Pierson Holloway (December 7, 1809 – September 9, 1883) was a U.S. Representative from Indiana from 1855 to 1857.

Early life and career 
Born in Waynesville, Ohio, Holloway moved with his parents to Cincinnati in 1813.
He attended the common schools.
Learned the printing business and served four years in the office of the Cincinnati Gazette.
He moved to Richmond, Indiana, in 1823.
Purchased the Richmond Palladium in 1832 and was its editor and proprietor until he died.

Political career 
He served as member of the State House of Representatives in 1843 and 1844.
He served in the State Senate 1844–1850.
He was appointed in 1849 examiner of land offices.

Congress 
Holloway was elected as an Indiana People's Party candidate to the Thirty-fourth Congress (March 4, 1855 – March 3, 1857).
He served as chairman of the Committee on Agriculture (Thirty-fourth Congress).

Later career and death 
He was appointed commissioner of patents and served from 1861 to 1865. He engaged as a patent attorney in Washington, D.C., until his death, on September 9, 1883, and was interred in Maple Grove Cemetery, Richmond, Indiana. However, he was reinterred in Earlham Cemetery.

References

1809 births
1883 deaths
People from Waynesville, Ohio
Opposition Party members of the United States House of Representatives from Indiana
United States Commissioners of Patents
People from Richmond, Indiana
Burials at Earlham Cemetery, Richmond, Indiana
19th-century American politicians
Members of the United States House of Representatives from Indiana